Sir Hedworth Williamson, 8th Baronet (25 March 1827 – 26 August 1900) was a British diplomat and Liberal Party politician who sat in the House of Commons from 1864 to 1874.

Williamson was the son of Sir Hedworth Williamson, 7th Baronet and his wife Hon. Anne Elizabeth Liddell, daughter of 1st Baron Ravensworth. He was educated at Eton College and at Christ Church, Oxford, later migrating to St John's College, Cambridge. He was an attache at St. Petersburgh from 1848 to 1850, and at Paris from 1850 till 1856. In 1861 he inherited the baronetcy on the death of his father. He was a Deputy Lieutenant and J.P. for Durham and Captain Commandant of the 1st Durham Volunteer Artillery for 28 years from its formation in 1860, later becoming its honorary colonel.

Williamson was elected as Member of Parliament (MP) for North Durham at an unopposed by-election in 1864, and held the seat until he stepped down at the 1874 general election. He was then appointed High Sheriff of Durham for 1877.

In 1880 Williamson donated land for Roker Park in Sunderland, which was opened on 23 June 1880.

Williamson married his cousin the Hon. Elizabeth Jane Hay Liddell, daughter of the 2nd Baron Ravensworth in 1863. Their son Hedworth inherited the baronetcy.

References

External links 
 

1827 births
1900 deaths
Liberal Party (UK) MPs for English constituencies
People from County Durham
People educated at Eton College
Alumni of Christ Church, Oxford
Alumni of St John's College, Cambridge
UK MPs 1859–1865
UK MPs 1865–1868
UK MPs 1868–1874
Baronets in the Baronetage of England
High Sheriffs of Durham